Helbert Frederico Carreiro da Silva (born 18 August 1979), known as Fred, is a Brazilian former footballer who currently is the Assistant Coach of Philadelphia Union II. Carreiro played for the Harrisburg Heat of the Major Arena Soccer League. He also played for Australian A-League side Melbourne Heart, MLS sides D.C. United & Philadelphia Union, and Brazilian side América among other clubs.

Career

Brazil
Fred began his career in his native Brazil, playing for Olympic Barbacena, Tupi, América and Guarani.

Melbourne Victory
Fred signed for Australian club Melbourne Victory in 2006 and, despite a controversial three-game suspension for an alleged elbow, was one of the standouts of the 2006–07 A-League season. His popularity increased when he appeared in a television commercial promoting underwear. He was voted best A-League player for season 2 by The World Game Team. In the 2007 A-League Grand Final against Adelaide United, Fred had four assists on the five goals scored by Archie Thompson.

D.C. United

After the season, Fred signed with Major League Soccer club D.C. United. It was reported to be a matter of money, as United offered a guaranteed salary of US$222,000 per year (which the Melbourne Victory could not match due to the more stringent salary cap in the A-League).

The name on the back of his D.C. United jersey was simply "Fred", despite initially being told he would have to use his proper last name, per MLS rules at the time (which have since changed). He made his debut on 3 April 2007 against Chivas de Guadalajara in a CONCACAF Champions Cup semifinal match. On 3 September 2008, Fred scored the game-winning goal in D.C. United's 2–1 win over the Charleston Battery in the US Open Cup Final.

Wellington Phoenix
On 14 November 2008, Fred was confirmed as a guest player for New Zealand-based A-League club Wellington Phoenix. He was scheduled to play six games for the Phoenix before returning to D.C. United for the next season. In his third game, he scored his first goal, against Adelaide United, although the Phoenix still lost 6–1. On 10 December 2008, Fred returned to Brazil due to his father's sudden death and on 18 December it was announced that Fred would not return to the Wellington Phoenix to complete his contract meaning he only appeared in three of his six scheduled games in New Zealand.

Philadelphia Union
On 13 January 2010, Fred was traded to Philadelphia Union, along with D.C. United's first-round 2010 MLS SuperDraft pick, and allocation money in exchange for Philadelphia's top spot in the allocation order. D.C. subsequently used the top allocation ranking to re-acquire goalkeeper Troy Perkins. A list telling the players that were available for the new MLS Re-Entry Draft revealed that he was available for the draft due to being out of contact.

New England Revolution
On 15 December 2010, Fred was chosen by New England Revolution in the second round of the 2010 MLS Re-Entry Draft. However, he declined the club's contract offer and pursued a contract outside of MLS.

Back to D.C. United
Fred returned to MLS and signed with D.C. United on 18 February 2011 after D.C. acquired his MLS rights from New England for a second-round 2013 MLS SuperDraft pick.

Melbourne Heart
On 20 June 2011, Fred was announced as one of Melbourne Heart's big name off-season signings, on a salary of $200,000 AUD for the season. He came following his brief second stint at D.C. United of MLS, officially joining his new club when the international transfer window opened in mid-July 2011. Melbourne Heart are the direct cross-town rivals of Fred's former club, Melbourne Victory, with whom he achieved the 2006/07 Premiership and Championship double. Fred played against his former team for the first time in the 3rd round of the 2011/12 season.

On 22 April 2012 Fred was named the Alex Tobin player of the year for 2012 whilst playing for Melbourne Heart. 

As a result of the Heart finishing second-to-last on the A-League ladder, their worst finish in an A-League season, Fred, along with teammates Simon Colosimo, Matt Thompson and Clint Bolton, were released by the Heart at the conclusion of the 2012–13 A-League season.

Return to Philadelphia Union
On 20 March 2014 Philadelphia Union re-acquired Fred through the MLS waiver draft system.

Personal life
Fred is the older brother of Júnior Carreiro, who is also a professional footballer and midfielder and his former teammate at D.C. United in 2011.

It has been reported that Fred holds a U.S. green card which would qualify him as a domestic player for MLS roster purposes.

Honours
Melbourne Victory
A-League Champions: 2006–07
A-League Premiers: 2006–07

D.C. United
Major League Soccer: 2007
Lamar Hunt U.S. Open Cup: 2008

Individual
Four Four Two Player of the Year: 2006–07
Four Four Two Import of the Season 2006–07
A-League Team of the Season: 2011–12

Career statistics
Updated 17 October 2010

References

External links
 
 Boys from Brazil

1979 births
Living people
Brazilian footballers
Brazilian expatriate footballers
Guarani FC players
Melbourne Victory FC players
D.C. United players
América Futebol Clube (MG) players
Tupi Football Club players
Philadelphia Union players
A-League Men players
Major League Soccer players
Expatriate soccer players in Australia
Expatriate soccer players in the United States
Wellington Phoenix FC players
Melbourne City FC players
Expatriate association footballers in New Zealand
Footballers from Belo Horizonte
Brazilian expatriate sportspeople in New Zealand
Philadelphia Union II players
USL Championship players
Association football midfielders
Marquee players (A-League Men)